The Gentleman Without a Residence (German: Der Herr ohne Wohnung) is a 1915 Austrian silent film directed by Fritz Freund and starring Gustav Waldau, Julius Brandt and Paul Morgan.

Cast
 Gustav Waldau as the drunken Baron
 Julius Brandt as Einspänner  
 Paul Morgan as Prof. Mandling  
 Frl. Zeckendorf  
 Alexander Herrnfeld

See also
The Gentleman Without a Residence (1925)
The Gentleman Without a Residence (1934)
Who's Your Lady Friend? (1937)

References

Bibliography
 Bock, Hans-Michael & Bergfelder, Tim. The Concise CineGraph. Encyclopedia of German Cinema. Berghahn Books, 2009.

External links

1915 comedy films
Austrian comedy films
Austrian silent feature films
Austrian films based on plays
Films produced by Erich Pommer
Austrian black-and-white films
1915 Austro-Hungarian films
Silent comedy films
1910s German-language films